Éder Gabriel Militão (born 18 January 1998) is a Brazilian professional footballer who plays for the La Liga club Real Madrid and the Brazil national team. Mainly a central defender, he can also play as a right back or defensive midfielder.

Militão began his career at São Paulo, playing 57 matches over a span of two years before transferring to Porto. In 2019, after one season in Portugal, he joined Real Madrid for a reported transfer fee of €50 million. He won two La Liga titles, and the Champions League in 2022.

Militão made his senior international debut for Brazil in 2018. He was part of their squads that won the Copa América in 2019 and came runners-up in 2021, also playing at the 2022 FIFA World Cup.

Club career

São Paulo
Born in Sertãozinho in the state of São Paulo, Militão began playing for São Paulo FC youth squads in 2010. He started in the first team for the 2016 Copa Paulista, and debuted on 2 July in a 2–1 loss at Ituano; the team from the state capital was playing in the tournament for its first time, with an U20 team. He played 11 matches and scored 2 goals, the first being in a 4–0 home win over CA Juventus on 18 September that ensured qualification to the second round.

Militão made his professional debut on 14 May 2017 in a 1–0 loss away to Cruzeiro, the opening match for the 2017 Campeonato Brasileiro Série A. He made 22 appearances over the season as the club finished in 13th place, and was sent off on 12 November towards the end of a 1–1 draw at Vasco da Gama. He contributed two goals over the campaign, starting by opening a 2–1 win at fellow strugglers Vitória on 17 September.

Militão made his last appearance for the club on 5 August 2018 when the Tricolor defeated Vasco 2–1 to reach first place in the year's national tournament.

Porto

On 7 August 2018, Militão signed a five-year contract with Portuguese defending champions Porto. He made his Primeira Liga debut on 2 September, starting in a 3–0 home win over Moreirense and assisting Porto's first goal, scored by captain Héctor Herrera. Over succeeding fixtures, Militão quickly cemented himself in the starting 11 as a centre-back, forming a defensive partnership with teammate Felipe.

On 28 November, Militão scored his first goal for the club in a 3–1 home victory against Schalke 04 for the 2018–19 UEFA Champions League group stage, heading the ball after a cross from Óliver. On 3 January 2019, Militão scored his first league goal, the match's only at Desportivo das Aves. He was named Primeira Liga's defender of the month on four consecutive occasions from September 2018 to January 2019.

Real Madrid
On 14 March 2019, Real Madrid announced that they had signed Militão to a six-year contract effective 1 July 2019 after paying a €50 million transfer fee to Porto. He made his debut on 14 September, coming on as a substitute for Sergio Ramos for the last half-hour in a 3–2 home victory over Levante. He made 15 appearances during the league season as Real Madrid won the 2019–20 La Liga.

Militão scored his debut goal for Madrid on 20 January 2021, heading in Marcelo's cross to open a Copa del Rey last 32 match away to third-tier Alcoyano; his team unexpectedly lost, 2–1. His debut league goal came on 1 May in a 2–0 win over Osasuna.

In 2021–22, Militão finally became a regular after the exits of veterans Sergio Ramos and Raphaël Varane from the Madrid defence. He partnered Austrian import David Alaba, under the management of Carlo Ancelotti. He scored once in their league-winning campaign, securing a 2–2 home draw with Elche on 23 January. Days earlier, the team won the Supercopa de España with a 2–0 final win over Athletic Bilbao in Saudi Arabia, though he was sent off for giving away a penalty through handball. He made 12 appearances in their victorious Champions League campaign, including the 1–0 final win over Liverpool at the Stade de France.

International career

In September 2018, Militão was called-up by coach Tite for Brazil's friendlies in the United States against the hosts and El Salvador after Fagner withdrew with injury. He made his debut on 11 September against the Salvadoreans at FedExField, playing the full 90 minutes of a 5–0 win.

In May 2019, Militão was included in Brazil's 23-man squad for the 2019 Copa América. In the final against Peru on 7 July, held at the Maracanã Stadium, he made a substitute appearance, coming on for Philippe Coutinho in the second half as his team won, 3–1.

Militão was named for the 2021 Copa América, again on home soil. He started three group games, and in the last one against Ecuador in Goiânia on 27 June, he scored his first international goal to open a 1–1 draw. In the knockout rounds, as Brazil made the final, his spot next to Marquinhos was taken by Thiago Silva.

On 7 November 2022, Militão was named in the squad for the 2022 FIFA World Cup. Unused in the opener against Serbia, he played at right-back in place of the injured Danilo in the 1–0 win over Switzerland in the second group game, and retained his place for the rest of the run to the quarter-finals as the recovered Danilo was placed on the left flank. With qualification already secured, he started in central defence alongside Bremer in a 3–2 loss to Cameroon in the last group game.

Career statistics

Club

International

As of match played 9 December 2022. Brazil score listed first, score column indicates score after each Militão goal.

Honours
Real Madrid
La Liga: 2019–20, 2021–22
Supercopa de España: 2019–20, 2021–22
UEFA Champions League: 2021–22
UEFA Super Cup: 2022
FIFA Club World Cup: 2022

Brazil
Copa América: 2019
 Superclásico de las Américas: 2018

Individual
Primeira Liga Defender of the Month: September 2018, October/November 2018, December 2018, January 2019
Primeira Liga Team of the Year: 2018–19
Primeira Liga Player Fair-Play Prize: 2018–19
 La Liga Team of the Season: 2021–22

References

External links

1998 births
Living people
Footballers from São Paulo (state)
Brazilian footballers
Association football midfielders
Association football defenders
São Paulo FC players
FC Porto players
Real Madrid CF players
Campeonato Brasileiro Série A players
Primeira Liga players
La Liga players
Brazil youth international footballers
Brazil international footballers
2019 Copa América players
2021 Copa América players
2022 FIFA World Cup players
Copa América-winning players
Brazilian expatriate footballers
Expatriate footballers in Portugal
Expatriate footballers in Spain
Brazilian expatriate sportspeople in Portugal
Brazilian expatriate sportspeople in Spain
UEFA Champions League winning players
People from Sertãozinho